The wildlife of the Philippines includes a significant number of endemic plant and animal species. The country's surrounding waters reportedly have the highest level of marine biodiversity in the world. The Philippines is considered one of the seventeen megadiverse countries as well as global biodiversity hotspot. In the 2000 Red List of the International Union for the Conservation of Nature and Natural Resources (IUCN), 418 of the country's 52,177 species were listed as threatened.

The Philippines has among the highest rates of discovery in the world with sixteen new species of mammals discovered in the last ten years. Because of this, the rate of endemism for the Philippines has risen and likely will continue to rise.

Birds 

There are 714 species of birds in the Philippines, of which 243 are endemic, three have been introduced by humans, and 52 are rare or accidental.  The Philippines has the third highest number of endemic birds only behind the much larger countries of Australia and Indonesia. There are 67 globally threatened species. These include the rufous hornbill and the critically endangered national bird of the Philippines, the Philippine eagle. The Philippines is also home to Tawi-Tawi's blue-winged racket-tail, the most endangered parrot species in Southeast Asia, the Sulu hornbill, one of the most endangered animals in the world with a population of just 27. and the Calayan rail, the most endangered rail species in the world, found only on a small island in the Babuyan Group of Islands.

According to the EDGE of Existence Programme of the Zoological Society of London, the Philippines has the highest bird endemism in the world. Six of the world's 50 most evolutionary distinct and globally endangered (EDGE) species are found in the Philippines. These species are the Philippine eagle (15th place, the highest from the Philippines), spoon-billed sandpiper (#19), black-hooded coucal (#22), Sulu hornbill (#41), Cebu brown-dove (#46), rufous-headed hornbill (#50). Previously, in 2013, when the list was up to 100, the various bleeding heart dove species found only in the Philippines and the Philippine cockatoo were also in the list.

Amphibians and reptiles 
There are more than 111 species of amphibians and 270 species of reptiles in the Philippines, 80% of the amphibians are endemic and 70% of the reptiles of the Philippines are also endemic. It is believed that there are not more than 14 of the 114 total species of snakes including flying snakes in the country are venomous. Several species of reptiles and amphibians remains undiscovered. Unfortunately, several of these species were believed to have disappeared without ever being discovered. The Philippines also has 50–60 endemic Platymantis frog species, by far the most diverse genus of amphibians in the archipelago.

The endemic freshwater crocodile Crocodylus mindorensis is critically endangered and is considered the most threatened crocodilian in the world. In 1982, wild populations were estimated to be only 500–1,000 individuals; by 1995 a mere 100 crocodiles remained living in the wild. The recent discovery of a population of this species in the Sierra Madre mountains of Luzon brings new hope for its conservation. Projects were being made in an effort to save the crocodiles. The Crocodile Rehabilitation, Observance and Conservation (CROC) Project of the Mabuwaya Foundation is active in carrying out such projects.

Other unique and threatened reptiles include Gray's monitor and the Philippine forest turtle. There are two newly discovered species of frugivorous monitor lizard, the Panay monitor lizard from the island of Panay and Northern Sierra Madre forest monitor from north east Luzon, there are only three species of monitor lizards that are specialized frugivores.

Freshwater fish 
The Philippines has about 330 freshwater fish, including nine endemic genera and more than 65 endemic species, many of which are confined to single lakes. An example is Sardinella tawilis, a freshwater sardine found only in Taal Lake. Lake Lanao, in Mindanao, seems to be experiencing the country's most catastrophic extinction event, with nearly all of the lake's endemic fish species now almost certainly extinct, primarily due to the introduction of tilapia, which is an edible fish, for the expansion of the fishing industry. Other exotic species were also introduced to the lake.

Insects and other invertebrates 

About 70 percent of the Philippines' nearly 21,000 recorded insect species are found only in the country. In addition about one-third of the 915 butterflies found here are endemic to the country, and over 110 of the more than 130 species of tiger beetle are found nowhere else. One of the largest butterflies in the world and the largest in the Philippines, the Magellan birdwing can be found here. The largest moth, the Atlas moth, can be found in the Philippines.

Crustaceans are very diverse in the archipelago. More than 50 species of freshwater crabs (in genera Carpomon, Insulamon, Isolapotamon, Mainitia, Mindoron, Ovitamon, Parathelphusa and Sundathelphusa) are known from the Philippines and all are endemic to the country.

Flora

See also
List of extinct animals of the Philippines
List of threatened species of the Philippines
List of non-marine molluscs of the Philippines
List of endemic birds of the Philippines
List of mammals of the Philippines
Environmental issues in the Philippines
Wildlife of Palawan

References 

Biota of archipelagoes
Philippines
Biota of the Philippines